Frogmore Cottage is a historic Grade II listed home on the Frogmore estate, which is part of Home Park in Windsor, England. Built in 1801 at the direction of Queen Charlotte in the gardens near Frogmore House, Frogmore Cottage is part of the Crown Estate, the monarch's public estate. The cottage became the residence of the Duke and Duchess of Sussex in the United Kingdom in 2019, and was their primary residence before they moved to Montecito, California in the United States. In March 2023, an agent of the couple said that they had been requested to vacate it. 

Before renovation, it had 10 bedrooms. During renovations two orangeries, a vegetable garden, and a yoga studio were also developed.

History 
The cottage was originally known as Double Garden Cottage and was listed in Queen Charlotte's 1801 accounts for her garden as having been built for £450 by a Mr Bowen. Queen Victoria had breakfast at the cottage on 28 June 1875 and noted an "immense number of little frogs" which she found "quite disgusting". The cottage has been listed Grade II on the National Heritage List for England since October 1975. The listing provides little of the history: "Early C19 plain 2 storey house with parapet. Centre break with porch. Glazing bar sashes. Stucco faced".

19th and 20th century tenants
The cottage was a retreat for Charlotte, the queen consort of George III, and her unmarried daughters. The theologian Henry James Sr. and his family lived at the cottage in the 1840s. A personal secretary of Queen Victoria's, Abdul Karim, moved to Frogmore Cottage in 1897 with his wife and father. Grand Duchess Xenia Alexandrovna in exile from her native Russia after the Russian Revolution stayed there in the 1920s.

21st century tenants
In the early 21st century, the cottage was a series of five separate units housing Windsor estate workers.

In 2019, the house was converted into a four-bedroom-and-nursery single-family home at a reported cost of £2.4 million from the Sovereign Grant for the Duke and Duchess of Sussex prior to the birth of their son, Archie Mountbatten-Windsor, in May 2019. As a property of a royal palace of state and designated heritage site, Frogmore Cottage was always scheduled to be renovated, regardless of occupant. The property was given as a grace and favour home to the couple by Elizabeth II. However, in January 2020, Buckingham Palace announced that the Duke and Duchess of Sussex would step down as senior working members of the royal family and shared the couple's "wish to repay Sovereign Grant expenditure for the refurbishment of Frogmore Cottage". In September, £2.4 million was received from Harry and Meghan, a part of which was offset against rental payments that were due at the time. Harry's lease on the property as a rent paying tenant was extended to March 2022.

Princess Eugenie, daughter of Prince Andrew, Duke of York, and her husband, Jack Brooksbank, took up residence with their son at the cottage in November 2020, In February 2022, it was announced that Prince Harry planned to renew the lease on the cottage, which would allow him to remain domiciled in the UK. In May 2022, it was reported that Harry's lease of the property had been renewed and Eugenie vacated the property.

In March 2023, it was reported that Prince Andrew, who lives in the nearby 30-room Royal Lodge in Windsor Great Park, had been offered Frogmore Cottage, and Prince Harry and his wife Meghan were requested to vacate the residence. The couple were reportedly notified of the decision in January and have until after the coronation to vacate the property.

References

1801 establishments in England
Grade II listed houses
Grade II listed buildings in Berkshire
Royal residences in England
Houses completed in 1801
Frogmore
Charlotte of Mecklenburg-Strelitz